John Kampfner is a British author, broadcaster and commentator. He is now an Executive Director at Chatham House, leading its UK in the World initiative. His sixth book Why The Germans Do It Better, Notes From A Grown-Up Country, was published in 2020 and chosen as one of the books of the year in 2020 and 2021 in a number of newspapers. He is currently working on a new book about Berlin.

Early life and education 
Kampfner was born in Singapore to a Jewish father from Bratislava and a Protestant mother from Chatham-Kent. He was educated at Westminster School. He went to The Queen's College, Oxford, where he received a BA degree in Modern History and Russian.

Career
Kampfner began his career as a foreign correspondent for Reuters in Moscow and Bonn. He moved to The Daily Telegraph, first in East Berlin where he reported on the fall of the Berlin Wall and the unification of Germany, and then as Bureau Chief in Moscow at the time of the dissolution of the Soviet Union. He went on to become chief political correspondent at the Financial Times (1995-1998) and political commentator for the BBC's Today radio programme and political correspondent on Newsnight (1998-2000).

In 2002 Kampfner won the Foreign Press Association awards for Film of the Year and Journalist of the Year for The Ugly War, a two-part BBC film on the Israeli–Palestinian conflict. His film War Spin, exposing the propaganda behind the rescue of Jessica Lynch, received considerable publicity in the US and UK.

Kampfner was editor of the New Statesman from 2005-2008. He was the British Society of Magazine Editors Current Affairs Editor of the Year in 2006.

He is currently a regular contributor to The Times and The New European.

He was named one of the 1000 most influential Londoners in the Evening Standard Progress 1000 survey in 2015, 2016 and 2017. In October 2015, he also won the Art and Design category at the HClub 100 awards.

In 2008 he was Founder Chair of Turner Contemporary, an art gallery in Margate designed by architect Sir David Chipperfield which has been seen as a model of arts-based regeneration. During his time, he welcomed the Queen and the Duchess of Cambridge on visits. In December 2015 he stepped down after seven and a half years.

Kampfner was chair of the Clore Social Leadership Programme between 2014–18, a charity which nurtures leaders in the charity sectors. He was also a member of the Council of King's College London for three years.

He was Chief Executive of the freedom of expression organisation Index on Censorship between 2008 and 2012. From 2012 to 2014, he was an external consultant for Google on freedom of expression and culture.

In 2014, he established the Creative Industries Federation, a national organisation to represent the arts, creative industries and cultural education.

In 2019 he became a Senior Associate Fellow at RUSI. In the same year he was appointed Chair of the House of Illustration.

In 2019, he was awarded an honorary doctorate by Bath Spa University for services to arts education and the creative industries.

Publications
Kampfner has written six books. These include: Inside Yeltsin's Russia: Corruption, Conflict, Capitalism (1994), an account of the early years of post-Communism; a 1998 biography of former Labour Foreign Secretary Robin Cook, and a study of Tony Blair's interventionist foreign policy Blair's Wars (2003), which gave one of the first authoritative accounts of the Iraq war and used in subsequent Whitehall enquiries, as well as school and university texts. His book Freedom For Sale: How We Made Money And Lost Our Liberty (2009) is an analysis of the seeming abandonment of liberty in the names of democracy and capitalism. The book was shortlisted for the Orwell Book prize in April 2010. The Rich, a 2000-year history, from slaves to super-yachts, is a historical comparison between contemporary oligarchs and those down the ages.

His latest book, Why The Germans Do It Better, Notes From A Grown-Up Country, was published by Atlantic in August 2020. A Sunday Times bestseller for many weeks in both hardback and paperback, the book received positive reviews and coverage in The Guardian, The Times, The Sunday Times, The Economist, New Statesman, TLS and Literary Review.

His latest book, a history of Berlin, is due to be published in late 2023.

Personal life
In 1992, Kampfner married BBC journalist Lucy Ash. The couple have two daughters and live in London.

References

External links

John Kampfner | Financial Times

1962 births
Living people
English Jews
People educated at The Hall School, Hampstead
People educated at Westminster School, London
Alumni of The Queen's College, Oxford
English people of Russian-Jewish descent
British male journalists
English columnists
English magazine editors
People associated with King's College London
British Jewish writers
English male non-fiction writers
British Jewish families
New Statesman people